Inc. India is a monthly business magazine published by 9.9 Media. The magazine in an Indian version of the popular US magazine Inc. that focuses on entrepreneurship and growth. The magazine claims to serve as a resource base for rapidly growing, Indian small- and mid-size enterprises. The electronic version of Inc. India was launched in February 2009 and the print version was expected to launch in October of the same year.

References

2009 establishments in India
9.9 Media Products
English-language magazines published in India
Business magazines published in India
Monthly magazines published in India
Online magazines published in India
Magazines established in 2009